The Jim Dandy Stakes is an American Thoroughbred horse race. The Grade II race has been held annually since 1964 at Saratoga Race Course in Saratoga Springs, New York. The race is open to horses age three over one and one-eighth miles on the dirt. It currently carries a purse of $600,000. Prior to 1971, the race was 1 mile in length. For 1971 only, the distance was decreased to 7 furlongs.

The Jim Dandy Stakes is usually run on the first Saturday of the late July Saratoga racing season and is named in honor of the 3-year-old colt,  Jim Dandy, who won the 1930 Travers Stakes at odds of 100 to 1, beating Triple Crown winner Gallant Fox.  The Jim Dandy Stakes is typically used as a preparatory race for the Travers Stakes.

The Jim Dandy was run for the 56th time in 2019.

Records
Speed record: 
  miles – 1:47.26 – Louis Quatorze (1996)

Most wins by an owner:
 3 - Godolphin Racing LLC (2012, 2020, 2021)
 3 – Henryk de Kwiatkowski (1982, 1985, 1995)
 3 – Melnyk Racing (2000, 2003, 2005)

Most wins by a jockey:
 4 – Eddie Maple (1981, 1982, 1984, 1986)
 4 – Jerry Bailey (1995, 2000, 2001, 2002)
 4 – John R. Velazquez (2003, 2004, 2005, 2010)

Most wins by a trainer:
 6 – Todd A. Pletcher (2000, 2003, 2004, 2005, 2011, 2013)

Winners

Notes

References
 Jim Dandy Stakes at the NTRA
 Whatever happened to Jim Dandy? from Colin's Ghost

Graded stakes races in the United States
Flat horse races for three-year-olds
Horse races in New York (state)
Recurring sporting events established in 1964
Saratoga Race Course
1964 establishments in New York (state)
Grade 2 stakes races in the United States